Sakhteman (also Romanized as Sākhtemān) is a village in Zangebar Rural District, in the Central District of Poldasht County, West Azerbaijan Province, Iran. At the 2006 census, its population was 152, in 27 families.

References 

Populated places in Poldasht County